Cry Baby is an American  brand of sour bubble gum manufactured by Tootsie Roll Industries.The product was originally named by David Klein who invented the Jelly Belly jelly beans.

Cry Babies, sometimes mistakenly referred to as Tear Jerkers, began production in 1991. Originally produced by Philadelphia Chewing Gum Corporation in Havertown, Pennsylvania, the candies were later purchased by the present-day manufacturer, Tootsie Roll Industries.

Cry Babies are best known for their sour coating, which disappears shortly after the gum is chewed. The product's packaging claims that the gum remains sour for 40 seconds once chewed. The name "Cry Baby" stems from the rumour that the candy is sour enough to cause a person's eyes to water.

They come in the following fruit flavors:
 Lemon
 Cherry
 Green Apple
 Blue Raspberry
 Orange

See also
 List of confectionery brands

References

Chewing gum
Tootsie Roll Industries brands